The 2014 Porsche Tennis Grand Prix was a women's tennis tournament played on indoor clay courts. It was the 37th edition of the Porsche Tennis Grand Prix, and was part of the Premier tournaments of the 2014 WTA Tour. It took place at the Porsche Arena in Stuttgart, Germany, from 21 April until 27 April 2014. Sixth-seeded Maria Sharapova won the singles title.

Points and prize money

Point distribution

Prize money 

* per team

Singles main draw entrants

Seeds 

 1 Rankings are as of April 14, 2014.

Other entrants 
The following players received wildcards into the main draw:
  Julia Görges
  Andrea Petkovic

The following players received entry from the qualifying draw:
  Gioia Barbieri
  Annika Beck
  Diāna Marcinkēviča
  Ajla Tomljanović

The following players received entry as lucky losers:
  Mona Barthel
  Johanna Konta

Withdrawals
Before the tournament
  Dominika Cibulková (achilles injury) → replaced by  Mona Barthel
  Kirsten Flipkens → replaced by  Lucie Šafářová
  Li Na (left knee injury) → replaced by  Sorana Cîrstea
  Caroline Wozniacki (left wrist injury) → replaced by  Johanna Konta

Retirements
  Carla Suárez Navarro (wrist injury)

Doubles main draw entrants

Seeds 

 Rankings are as of April 14, 2014.

Other entrants
The following pair received entry as alternates:
  Antonia Lottner /  Anna Zaja

Retirements
Before the tournament
  Andrea Hlaváčková (viral illness)

Finals

Singles 

  Maria Sharapova defeated  Ana Ivanovic, 3–6, 6–4, 6–1

Doubles 

  Sara Errani /  Roberta Vinci defeated  Cara Black /  Sania Mirza, 6–2, 6–3

References

External links 
 

Porsche Tennis Grand Prix
Porsche Tennis Grand Prix
2014 in German tennis
2010s in Baden-Württemberg
Porsch